Wrong Rosary is a 2009 Turkish drama film directed by Mahmut Fazıl Çoşkun.

Reception

Awards 
 38th International Film Festival Rotterdam - Tiger Award (Won)

See also 
 2009 in film
 Turkish films of 2009

External links
  for the film
 
 Filmpot page for the film

References

Films set in Turkey
Turkish drama films